The Entlebuch Biosphere is a natural reserve at the foot of the Alps, and includes the 395 km² valley of the Little Emme River between Bern and Lucerne in the Swiss Canton of Lucerne.

In September 2001, the region became the second UNESCO Biosphere Reserve in Switzerland, after the Swiss National Park.

See also 
 Entlebuch (district)
 Nature parks in Switzerland

External links 

Entlebuch Biosphere
UNESCO Biosphere directory website

Biosphere reserves of Switzerland
Geography of the canton of Lucerne
Tourist attractions in the canton of Lucerne
Protected areas of the Alps